Setté Cama is a village in Gabon, lying on the peninsula between the Ndogo Lagoon and the Atlantic Ocean.  In the sixteenth century, it was a major European colonial sea port trading in timber and ivory.  Long declined, it is now home to a museum and an airstrip and lies on the edge of the Loango National Park.

Populated places in Ngounié Province
Ramsar sites in Gabon